Amanda Helen Pennekamp (born July 17, 1981) is an American model, television personality, and former beauty queen from Columbia, South Carolina who has competed in the Miss USA and Miss Earth pageants.

Pennekamp won the Miss South Carolina USA 2004 title in late 2003 and represented South Carolina in the Miss USA 2004 pageant held in Hollywood, California in April 2004.  She placed first runner-up to Shandi Finnessey of Missouri in the nationally televised pageant, the state's highest placement since Lu Parker won the Miss USA title in 1994.

In August 2006 Pennekamp won the first Miss Earth USA pageant and succeeded Amanda Kimmel as the United States' representative at the Miss Earth pageant.  The pageant took place in Manila, Philippines on November 26, 2006. She made the top 16 and also placed in the top 15 preliminary swimsuit competition.

Pennekamp, who studied theatre and speech communications at Newberry College, is a member of the Alpha Xi Delta sorority.  The college established the Pennekamp Scholarship for the Performing Arts in her honor.

She is currently living in Columbia, South Carolina and working as a model and Host of The V Fixxx for the Vegas Entertainment Network. Also, she is an instructor for Gowns and Crowns which is the basis for the show King of the Crown. She is married to another former model Brian Bluestein and they have a son born in 2012 and a daughter born in 2015. She is represented by the Patrick Talent Agency.

References

External links
Miss South Carolina USA official website
Miss USA official website
Amanda Pennekamp's Interview on MUSICandMODELING.com

 

Living people
Miss USA 2004 delegates
Newberry College alumni
Miss Earth 2006 contestants
Miss Earth United States delegates
1981 births